Kazansky (masculine), Kazanskaya (feminine), or Kazanskoye (neuter) may refer to:
Kazansky District, a district in Tyumen Oblast, Russia
Moscow Kazanskaya railway station, a railway station in Moscow, Russia
Kazansky Bridge, a bridge across the Griboyedov Canal in St. Petersburg, Russia
Kazansky (rural locality) (Kazanskaya, Kazanskoye), several rural localities in Russia
Michel Kazanski (born 1953), French archaeologist

See also
Kazan (disambiguation)